Steffi Graf was the six-time defending champion, but she lost to Arantxa Sánchez Vicario in the final, 6–3, 6–3.

Seeds

Draw

Finals

Top half

Bottom half

External links
 ITF tournament edition details

Citizen Cup - Singles